Doliops schultzei is a species of beetle in the family Cerambycidae. It was described by Barševskis and Jäger in 2014.

References

Doliops
Beetles described in 2014